Milos Rajković (born 1985 in Belgrade) is a Serbian animator known by the pseudonym Sholim.

Sholim is known for his surreal looped GIFs and animations, most of his videos are made with Photoshop and After Effects.

See also
 GIF art

References

External links 
 Sholim's website
 

Living people
1985 births
Date of birth missing (living people)
Serbian animators
Serbian YouTubers
Surreal comedy
YouTube channels launched in 2013
YouTube animators
Artists from Belgrade